Predrag J. Marković (born 6 September 1965) is a Serbian politician and historian. A member of the National Assembly of Serbia from 2020 to 2021, he is currently serving as one of the vice-presidents of the Socialist Party of Serbia.

Early life 
Marković was born on 6 September 1965 in Belgrade, SR Serbia, SFR Yugoslavia. He graduated from the Faculty of Philosophy of the University of Belgrade in 1995.

Career 
Marković was a member of the Democratic Party until 2014, when he left the party and joined the Enough is Enough movement. He was its member until 2015 when he joined the Socialist Party of Serbia and became one of its vice-presidents.

He became a member of the National Assembly of Serbia after the 2020 parliamentary election, though he resigned on 19 May 2021.

Personal life 
He is married and has two children. By profession, he is a historian.

References 

1965 births
Living people
Democratic Party (Serbia) politicians
Enough is Enough (party) politicians
Socialist Party of Serbia politicians
University of Belgrade Faculty of Philosophy alumni
Serbian historians
Politicians from Belgrade
Members of the National Assembly (Serbia)